Mike Adams (born 1959) is the manager of the Grenada national football team.

He began his playing career at Chelsea but it was cut short at the age of 21 due to  a serious knee injury.

He was appointed as the national team's head coach/manager in February 2011.

Prior to this he has been used as a consultant to the national team, he was appointed in January 2004, by the Grenadian Football Association. He attracted players such as Delroy Facey to play for the Spiceboyz. Adams managed Grenada at the 2005 Caribbean Cup, guiding the team out of the group stage before being knocked out by a second-round defeat by St Vincent and the Grenadines.

References

External links
Profile on Facebook.com
Profile at SoccerWay

English football managers
Grenada national football team managers
English footballers
Chelsea F.C. players
Living people
1959 births
Date of birth missing (living people)
2011 CONCACAF Gold Cup managers
Association footballers not categorized by position
Place of birth missing (living people)